Quarterstaff: The Tomb of Setmoth is an interactive fiction role-playing video game developed by Scott Schmitz and Ken Updike and released by Infocom for Macintosh in 1988. The game features a text parser, graphics, a dynamically updated map, and a graphical interface that incorporates Mac OS hierarchical menus.

Overview
The player takes the part of Titus, a former blacksmith sent by the Druid Council to explore the remains of an underground colony of druids who vanished without a trace. During the course of his adventures, Titus may befriend other characters and persuade them to join his party. Character skills improve with practice, and the game tracks the hunger, thirst and energy levels of characters.

Release history
Quarterstaff: The Tomb of Setmoth was based on Quarterstaff, a game released by Simulated Environment Systems in 1987. Simulated Environment Systems designed the game to support add-on modularity, and planned to create a town module to serve as a hub from which to send the characters of Quarterstaff on other adventures, retaining their inventories and experience.

Activision purchased the rights to the game from Simulated Environment Systems in 1988, and released the game with improvements including color graphics, an upgraded interface, and writing input from Amy Briggs. The box cover art was by Ken Barr and was reproduced in a color poster packaged with the game. Versions for the Apple IIGS and IBM PC were announced but never released. A planned sequel titled Storm Giants was never released.

StarCraft, Inc. released Japanese language versions of Quarterstaff for PC-98 in 1990 and Sharp X68000 in 1991.

Reception
The Simulated Environment Systems version of Quarterstaff was reviewed positively in Dragon, which called it "among the finest fantasy role-playing games available for any system" and "the most true to form FRP game we've found". Dragon praised the game's NPC artificial intelligence and the need to coordinate the actions of player characters. The Dragon reviewers gave the game 5 out of 5 stars.

Macworld reviewed the Simulated Environment Systems version of Quarterstaff, praising its UI, stating that the "Interface lets you concentrate on solving game puzzles, rather than on the quirks of the interface". Macworld furthermore praises its "flexible" gameplay, expressing that "Quarterstaff offers a refreshing degree of flexibility in the types of activity it will accept. You can divide your group to explore different rooms ... In combat, you can engage in missile fire across room boundaries - Eolene can stand out of harm's way and fire arrows at a monster in the next room while Bruno and Titus charge in and attack face-to-face. The ability to direct individual or group efforts gives you a certain amount of tactical creativity." Macworld also praises the sound, automap feature, graphics, and lack of 'instant death' traps, instead allowing the player to escape triggered traps, or bring other members of the party to rescue them. They call Quarterstaff "a new approach to an old computer-game genre." Macworld however heavily criticizes a fatal glitch in their 1.0 review copy; one of the puzzles required to complete the game is unable to be completed.

MacUser magazine rated the Simulated Environment Systems version of Quarterstaff four out of five mice, calling it a "must-have" for fantasy role-playing fans and saying that it "closely approximates what it's like to play a non-computer fantasy role-playing game." MacUser suggested that newcomers to role-playing games might prefer a lighter, less time-intensive introduction to the genre.

Tilt gave the Infocom version of Quarterstaff 18 out of 20, singling out the game's digitized sound and high quality writing, and describing the interface as a model of flexibility. Tilt praised the game's blend of role-playing and adventure game elements and called Quarterstaff the best game they'd seen on the Macintosh that year.

Feelies
Infocom included extra novelty items called feelies with their packaged games. Included with Quarterstaff were:
 A parchment, titled "The Path to Enlightenment"
 A wooden druidic coin, which could be used in conjunction with the parchment and an in-game wand to identify items
 A color poster

References

External links
 
 Quarterstaff at Resonant.org

1988 video games
Classic Mac OS games
Infocom games
NEC PC-9801 games
Role-playing video games
X68000 games
Video games developed in the United States
Video games scored by Russell Lieblich